Sir Robert Wallace KC (1850 – 19 March 1939) was an Irish-born barrister and Liberal Party politician.

He was born in County Antrim, the 3rd son of Rev. Robert Wallace of Dublin, and was educated at Queen's University, Belfast.

He was admitted to the Middle Temple on 8 November 1871 and was Called to the Bar on 6 June 1874. He contested Wandsworth in 1885, Edinburgh West in 1886, Renfrewshire West in 1892 before being elected as the Member of Parliament (MP) for Perth at the 1895 general election. He held the seat until 1907, when he resigned his seat to become Chairman of the County of London sessions, a post which he held until 1931.

He was knighted in 1916.

References

Sources
Who Was Who

External links

 

1850 births
1939 deaths
Members of the Parliament of the United Kingdom for Scottish constituencies
Scottish Liberal Party MPs
UK MPs 1895–1900
UK MPs 1900–1906
UK MPs 1906–1910
Alumni of Queen's University Belfast